Mishima is a Catalan indie pop band from Barcelona, Spain. Formed in 1999, the band consists of David Carabén, Marc Lloret, Dani Vega, Xavi Caparrós, and Alfons Serra. The group's name refers to Japanese author Yukio Mishima. 

Mishima's first two albums, recorded in English were well received by the critics, but their major success came in 2005, with the release of the third album, Trucar a casa. Recollir les fotos. Pagar la multa ("Call home. Pick up photos. Pay the fine"), in the Catalan language. Their subsequent albums have been in Catalan.

They released their fourth album in 2007. Titled Set tota la vida (Thirsty the whole life), it consists of nine stories written and sung by David Carabén. Spanish music magazine Rockdelux called it one of the best Spanish albums of the decade.

In 2010, their fifth album, Ordre i aventura (Order and adventure), was released in Barcelona. In 2011, they played at the Palau de la Música Catalana, a concert hall in Barcelona designated as a UNESCO World Heritage Site.

Discography

Albums
 Lipstick traces (2000), The Rest Is Silence/Discmedi
 The fall of public man (2003), The Rest Is Silence/Discmedi
 Trucar a casa. Recollir les fotos. Pagar la multa (2005), Discmedi
 Set tota la vida (2007), Sinnamon
 Ordre i aventura (2010), Sones
 L'amor feliç (2012), The Rest Is Silence/Warner
 L'ànsia que cura (2014), The Rest Is Silence/Warner
 Ara i res (2017), The Rest Is Silence/Warner
 L'aigua clara (2022)

DVDs
 Palau (DVD + 2CDs) (2011)

References

External links
 Mishima
 Mishima on Myspace
 Discography and lyrics

Musical groups from Catalonia
Indie pop groups